Bicycle Route 66 is a bicycle touring route, developed and mapped by Adventure Cycling Association, that largely parallels the original U.S. Route 66, also known as the Mother Road, from Chicago, Illinois, to Santa Monica, California.

Route 
At 2,485.7 miles (4,000.3 km), Bicycle Route 66 largely follows the original U.S. Route 66, which now exists in sections as Historic Route 66.

Terrain 
Bicycle Route 66 varies in terrain from flat prairie, to rolling hills, to vast expanses of desert.

States 
Bicycle Route 66 takes riders through the following states:
 Illinois
 Missouri
 Kansas
 Oklahoma
 Texas
 New Mexico
 Arizona
 California

See also 
 Adventure Cycling Route Network

References

External links
 Historic Route 66

Cycleways in the United States